William George Hundley (August 16, 1925 – June 11, 2006) was an American criminal defense attorney, who specialized in the representation of political figures accused of white-collar crimes. Earlier in the 1950s and 1960s, as a United States Department of Justice attorney, he became known for the prosecution of racketeering figures. He once encouraged narcotics dealer and loan shark Joseph Valachi to outline for public consumption the structure of the then secret Mafia or Cosa Nostra.

Hundley died at the age of eighty of liver cancer at his home in Vienna in Fairfax County, Virginia.

References

 

1925 births
2006 deaths
20th-century American lawyers
Criminal defense lawyers
Fordham University School of Law alumni
Lawyers from Pittsburgh
People from Brooklyn
People from Washington, D.C.
People from Vienna, Virginia
United States Army soldiers
United States Army personnel of World War II
Deaths from liver cancer
Deaths from cancer in Virginia